The Garden City Telegram is a local newspaper for Garden City, Kansas, published six days a week, with a circulation of nearly 8,000.

The Telegram was purchased by Hutchinson, Kansas-based Harris Enterprises in 1953. In November 2016, GateHouse Media purchased the Telegram and the five other Harris newspapers.

See also
 Media in Garden City, Kansas
 List of newspapers in Kansas

References

External links
 Garden City Telegram official website

Newspapers published in Kansas
Finney County, Kansas
Gannett publications